Frank Sullivan  is a Scottish medical doctor who works as a general practitioner (GP) and who is a medical researcher. He is Director of Research at the School of Medicine at University of St Andrews. He was the first Gordon F. Cheesbrough Research Chair in Family and Community Medicine at North York General Hospital, Canada. He was the director of the Scottish School of Primary Care from 2007 to 2014.

Education
He studied medicine at the University of Glasgow. He then completed a PhD in Health Services Research.

Academic career
He has worked as a GP since 1984 when he joined a practice in Blantyre, South Lanarkshire. He was appointed to a lecturer’s post at the Glasgow in 1985.

He took up a new chair in Primary Care Research and Development at the University of Dundee in 1998. He was appointed as the Director of the Scottish School of Primary Care in 2007. He took up the chair of the UK Heads of department of Primary Care in 2010. The following year he chaired the RCGP’s Research Paper of the Year Award panel.

In February 2014 he was appointed as the first Gordon F. Cheesbrough Research Chair in Family and Community Medicine at North York General Hospital, which was the first position of its kind in Canada.

In 2015 he gave the James Mackenzie Lecture for the Royal College of General Practitioners.

Published research
He has published more than 200 journal articles. In 2009 he was awarded “Research Paper of the Year” at the BMJ Group awards.

Honours
In 2011, he was elected a Fellow of the Royal Society of Edinburgh.

References

External links
 profile at University of St Andrews

Living people
20th-century Scottish medical doctors
21st-century Scottish medical doctors
Scottish general practitioners
Alumni of the University of Glasgow
Academics of the University of Dundee
Fellows of the Royal College of General Practitioners
Fellows of the Royal Society of Edinburgh
Place of birth missing (living people)
Year of birth missing (living people)